Pakuhaji is a district located in the Tangerang Regency of Banten in Java, Indonesia.

The sub-district of Kramat formed part of the particuliere landerij or private domain of Tan Eng Goan, 1st Majoor der Chinezen of Batavia, and of his successor, the 2nd Majoor Tan Tjoen Tiat.

References

Tangerang Regency
Districts of Banten
Populated places in Banten
Particuliere landerijen